Anni ( Sister in law) is a 2001-2003 Tamil-language soap opera, starring Malavika Avinash, Subhalekha Sudhakar, Sriman, Deepak Dinkar, Prem and among others.  Jaya TV and ran for 639 episodes. K. Balachander wrote the story and produced the show. The episodes were directed by Samuthirakani.

Re-Telecast
Jaya TV started airing the repeat telecast of the show from 25 November  2019. It currently airs Monday to Friday at 8 pm IST

Cast
 Malavika Avinash as Angayarkanni Muthaiya (Anni)
 Subhalekha Sudhakar as A. Ramanathan (Anni's father-in-law)
 Prem as Muthaiya (Anni's husband)
 Sriman as Nilakandan
 Deepak Dinkar as Babu (Muthaiya's second youngest brother)
 Soumya as Chitra Murali
 T. V. Varadarajan as Doctor
 Kuyili as Thenmozhi 
 Revathi Sankaran as Kamala (Ramanathan's elder sister)
 V. S. Raghavan as Alavandan (Ramanathan's father)
 Santhoshi as Monika
 Kavithalaya Krishnan as Subbaiya (Bhaskar's uncle)
 Vaishnavi as Anjali
 M. Bhanumathi as Valliyammai (Anni's mother-in-law)
 Reena as Malathi Bhaskar(Ramanathan's second daughter)
 Ramachandran as Bhaskaran (Malathi's husband)
 Muthu Subramaniam as Angayarkanni's father
 Geetha as Saradha
 Rojashree as Radhika (Muthaiya's youngest sister)
 SSR Kannan as Murali (Muthaiya's younger brother)
 Kaushik as Hariharan (Radhika's love interest)
 - as - (Muthaiya's elder sister)
 - as Arjun (Muthaiya's nephew)
 Ranjitha as Ranjitha (Muthaiya's niece)

References

External links
official website 
Jaya TV on Youtube

Jaya TV television series
Tamil-language legal television series
2003 Tamil-language television series debuts
2005 Tamil-language television series endings
2000s Tamil-language television series
2016 Tamil-language television series debuts
Tamil-language television shows